Rufus Battle (November 7, 1896 – February 22, 1954), also listed as Battles, was an American baseball catcher in the Negro leagues. He played with the Birmingham Black Barons and the Harrisburg Giants in 1924.

References

External links
 and Seamheads 
 Rufus Battle at Arkansas Baseball Encyclopedia

Harrisburg Giants players
Birmingham Black Barons players
1896 births
1954 deaths
Baseball players from Arkansas
Baseball catchers
20th-century African-American sportspeople